The Avengers are a fictional superhero team created by Marvel Comics that appear in comic books. Aside from comics, the Avengers appear in various forms of media such as in novels, television shows, movies, videogames and stage shows.

Novels
 The Avengers Battle the Earth-Wrecker by Otto Binder was published as a mass market paperback novel by Bantam Books (F3569) in June 1967. The cover illustration depicts Captain America, Goliath; Hawkeye; Quicksilver and the Scarlet Witch (the latter pair do not actually appear).
 The team also feature in the Pocket Books line of Marvel-based paperback novels of the late 1970s. Jim Shooter's short story "This Evil Undying" (1979) - featuring the robot Ultron as the villain - appeared as part of an anthology entitled The Marvel Superheroes. The story was later adapted for the ongoing title.
The Man Who Stole Tomorrow (1979), a full-length novel by David Michelinie, describes the Avengers battle with Kang the Conqueror in the 40th century.
 The Berkeley Boulevard imprint published several Avengers tie-ins, each a team-up with other superhero teams: with the X-Men against the Leader in Greg Cox's Gamma Quest trilogy (1999–2000) and with the Thunderbolts against Baron Zemo in Pierce Askegren's The Avengers and the Thunderbolts (1999).
 Pocket Books published two tie-ins with the alternate universe team the Ultimates: Michael Jan Friedman's Tomorrow Men (2006) and Alex Irvine's Against All Enemies (2007).
 Marvel Comics published Alisa Kwitney's New Avengers: Break-Out (2013) as a tie-in to the live-action Avengers film. Inspired by both the movie and the New Avengers comic books, it featured Captain America, Iron Man, Spider-Man, Luke Cage, Spider-Woman, Hawkeye and the Black Widow.
 Marvel Comics published Dan Abnett's Avengers: Everybody Wants To Rule The World (2015) as a tie-in to Avengers: Age of Ultron. The line-up in the book includes Iron Man, Captain America, the Hulk, Thor, Black Widow, Hawkeye, Quicksilver, the Scarlet Witch, and the Vision. In the course of the novel, the Avengers each find themselves dealing with 'Condition Alpha' threats (potentially world-ending attacks)- Captain America and S.H.I.E.L.D. facing the latest threat from Hydra and Baron von Strucker, Black Widow and Hawkeye dealing with an AIM operation, Iron Man stopping Ultron's latest attack with the Vision and Quicksilver, Thor and Scarlet Witch attempting to stop a ritual cast by Dormammu and Bruce Banner brought in by SHIELD to investigate the latest plan of the High Evolutionary- before they learn that all these villains were provoked by the Supreme Intelligence as part of a plan to undermine humanity from the inside.
 The Avengers appear in the opening of Stuart Moore's Thanos: Death Sentence (2017), with a line-up consisting of Captain America, Iron Man, Thor, Captain Marvel, the Vision and the Scarlet Witch. The book was published by Marvel.

Television

 Adaptations of Avengers stories appeared in The Marvel Super Heroes (1966), primarily in the "Captain America" and "The Incredible Hulk" segments. The series ran in syndication five days a week, with "Captain America" featured on Monday's episode; "The Incredible Hulk" on Tuesday; "Iron Man" on Wednesday; "Thor" on Thursday, and the "Sub-Mariner" on Friday.
 The team also made appearances in the 1981 Spider-Man series.
 The Fantastic Four animated series featured non-speaking cameos by The Avengers. In the season two episode "To Battle the Living Planet" the Avengers assist the Fantastic Four in rescuing earthquake victims. The Avengers appear once more in "Doomsday" briefly fighting Doctor Doom. Aside from these, both Thor and the Hulk make guest appearances in episodes in speaking parts.
 In the X-Men animated series, an alternate version of The Avengers appeared in the episode "One Man's Worth". In a timeline in which Charles Xavier was murdered before founding the X-Men, Captain America is the leader of The Avengers, a task force of superhuman mutant hunters fighting a war against the Mutant Resistance led by Magneto.
 The Avengers: United They Stand was an animated series consisting of thirteen episodes. It originally aired from October 30, 1999, to February 26, 2000, and was produced by Avi Arad and distributed by 20th Century Fox Television. This series featured a team composed of Ant-Man (leader); the Wasp; Wonder Man; Tigra; Hawkeye and the Scarlet Witch. The Falcon and the Vision were added to the roster in the opening episodes. Captain America and Iron Man only make one appearance while Thor only appears in the opening titles and would have appeared in the proposed season two.
 The Marvel Animation division and the outside studio Film Roman produced an Avengers animated TV series, The Avengers: Earth's Mightiest Heroes, which began broadcast in 2010. The show debuted on Disney XD in Fall 2010 starting with a 20 part micro-series. The series features a team based on the roster for the original Avengers, composed of Ant-Man, the Hulk, Iron Man, Thor, and the Wasp, with Captain America, the Black Panther, Hawkeye, Ms. Marvel and the Vision later joining the ranks. Wolverine, War Machine, Thing, Luke Cage, Iron Fist and Spider-Man also briefly form the 'New Avengers' with Spider-Man joining the main team as a reserve member afterwards.
 A group of heroes assembled in the Iron Man: Armored Adventures season finale, "The Makluan Invasion", appears to be a variation of the Avengers team. It consistes of Iron Man, War Machine, Rescue, Hawkeye, General Nick Fury, the Black Widow, the Hulk, and the Black Panther.
 Marvel announced The Avengers: Earth's Mightiest Heroes would not be renewed for a third season, but cancelled for a new series Avengers Assemble. The roster consists of Iron Man, Captain America, Hulk, Thor, Hawkeye, the Black Widow, and the Falcon based on the movie version. During the show's second season, the Scott Lang version of Ant-Man joined the team. The same iteration of the team guest-starred in the two-part Season 3 premiere of Ultimate Spider-Man, where Spider-Man briefly joined the Avengers. The team is also featured in the second season of Guardians of the Galaxy. In season 4 titled Avengers: Secret Wars Ant-Man, Black Panther, Captain Marvel, Ms. Marvel, Vision, and the Hope van Dyne version of the Wasp are part of the All-New, All-Different Avengers team formed by Black Panther after the old Avengers disappear.
 A Japanese anime series, Marvel Disk Wars: The Avengers, began airing in Japan in 2014. Produced by Toei Animation, the story revolves around a group of youths that can use special discs to summons the Avengers, who were sealed in the discs by Loki. The main cast consisted of Captain America, Iron Man, the Hulk, Thor, Spider-Man, and the Wasp. Over the course of the series, other Avengers such as Hawkeye, the Black Widow, the Falcon, and the Black Panther also appear in guest-starring roles.
 A second anime series, Marvel Future Avengers, began airing in Japan in 2017. Produced by Madhouse, the series follows a group of teenagers that were experimented on by Hydra, whom the Avengers take in and train to become the "Future Avengers". The core Avengers team consists of Iron Man, Captain America, Hulk, Thor, and Wasp; others such as Captain Marvel, Hawkeye, Black Widow, Falcon, Black Panther, Spider-Man, Iron Fist, Dr Strange and Ms. Marvel make frequent guest appearances.

Film

Animated

 Marvel Animation has produced two animated films based upon the Ultimate incarnations of the Avengers; Ultimate Avengers and Ultimate Avengers 2.
 The children of the Avengers are featured in the animated film; Next Avengers: Heroes of Tomorrow. Aged versions of Tony Stark and the Vision appear as well.
 The team appears in the anime film Avengers Confidential: Black Widow & Punisher, with a line-up consisting of the Black Widow, Iron Man, Thor, War Machine, the Hulk, Hawkeye, and Captain Marvel.
 The team appears in the animated movie Marvel Super Hero Adventures: Frost Fight! In the film, the Avengers consist of Captain America, Iron Man, Thor, the Hulk, Captain Marvel and Reptil.

Live-action

The Avengers are a common narrative plot thread in the Marvel Studios films of the Marvel Cinematic Universe, beginning as early as Iron Man wherein the "Avengers Initiative" was introduced. It was revealed at the end of Captain Marvel, Nick Fury named it after seeing Carol Danvers' callsign on her jet.
 Marvel Studios released the live-action film The Avengers on May 4, 2012. Joss Whedon wrote and directed the film. Cast team members include Robert Downey, Jr. as Iron Man, Chris Evans as Captain America, Mark Ruffalo as the Hulk, Chris Hemsworth as Thor, Scarlett Johansson as the Black Widow, and Jeremy Renner as Hawkeye. The film depicts the origin story of the team.
 A sequel, Avengers: Age of Ultron, written and directed by Whedon, was released on May 1, 2015. The film features all the Avengers returning from the first film, and introduce new team members the Scarlet Witch, portrayed by Elizabeth Olsen, Quicksilver, played by Aaron Taylor-Johnson, and the Vision, played by Paul Bettany. At the end of Age of Ultron, a new roster of Avengers is established which includes Captain America, the Black Widow, the Scarlet Witch, the Falcon (portrayed by Anthony Mackie), the Vision, and War Machine (portrayed by Don Cheadle).
 The new Avengers roster appears in Captain America: Civil War, directed by Anthony and Joe Russo and released on May 6, 2016. In Civil War, the team is fractured into two opposing groups, one led by Captain America and the other by Iron Man. Captain America's group consists of himself, Hawkeye, the Falcon, the Scarlet Witch, Ant-Man (Paul Rudd) and the Winter Soldier (Sebastian Stan), while Iron Man's group consists of himself, War Machine, the Black Widow, Spider-Man (Tom Holland), the Black Panther (Chadwick Boseman), and the Vision.
 The Avengers, broken up in the fallout of the events of Civil War, appear again in Avengers: Infinity War, also directed by the Russo brothers and released on April 27, 2018. In this film, they join forces with the Guardians of the Galaxy, Doctor Strange (Benedict Cumberbatch), Wong (Benedict Wong), Spider-Man, the Winter Soldier, Black Panther and the army of Wakanda to stop the alien Thanos (Josh Brolin) as he attempts to claim the Infinity Stones. Their campaign fails as Thanos acquires all six Stones and kills half the universe, including almost all of the Guardians and several Avengers, leaving Iron Man, Thor, Hulk, Captain America, Hawkeye, Black Widow, War Machine, Nebula (Karen Gillan), and Rocket (voiced by Bradley Cooper). These events leads Fury to call Captain Marvel (Brie Larson) to help them where they appeared in a mid end credit for Captain Marvel.
 Avengers: Endgame was released on April 26, 2019. In the five-year jump since the events of Infinity War, Danvers, Nebula, and Rocket join the Avengers after they discover that Thanos has destroyed the Infinity Stones to prevent anyone undoing his victory. Ant-Man emerges from the quantum realm after being trapped there since the Snap. He joins the team with a proposition that they retrieve the Infinity Stones from the past in order to restore the damage made by Thanos, using Lang's experience and Hank Pym's research about the quantum realm to devise a means of travelling in time. The restored Avengers and allies appear in the final battle against Thanos, including Doctor Strange, Wong, Spider-Man, the Scarlet Witch, the Falcon, the Winter Soldier, the Wasp (Evangeline Lilly), Star-Lord (Chris Pratt), Gamora (Zoe Saldana), Drax the Destroyer (Dave Bautista), Groot (voiced by Vin Diesel), Mantis (Pom Klementieff), Black Panther,  Shuri (Letitia Wright), M'Baku (Winston Duke), Pepper Potts (Gwyneth Paltrow), Okoye (Danai Gurira), Valkyrie (Tessa Thompson), Korg (Taika Waititi), Miek, Howard the Duck and Kraglin (Sean Gunn). At the end, Black Widow and Iron Man die, Thor joins the Guardians, and Captain America passes his shield and mantle to the Falcon, making him his successor after he decided to return to the 1940s to live the rest of his life with Peggy Carter.
 The Avengers are set to return in the upcoming films Avengers: The Kang Dynasty, to be released on May 2, 2025, and Avengers: Secret Wars, to be released on May 1, 2026.

Video and computer games
The Avengers are featured in the arcade and console game Captain America and the Avengers (1991); Avengers in Galactic Storm (1995); Marvel: Ultimate Alliance (2006), its sequel Marvel: Ultimate Alliance 2 (2009), and Avengers: Battle for Earth (2012). The Marvel vs. Capcom games feature various Avengers members as playable characters. Marvel Ultimate Alliance 3: The Black Order also features the Avengers as main characters.

The team is also featured heavily in the social network game Marvel: Avengers Alliance (2012) and the mobile app game Avengers Initiative (2012).

The 2013 video game Lego Marvel Super Heroes features the Avengers as one of the main protagonists alongside the X-Men, the Fantastic Four, Spider-Man, Silver Surfer, Nick Fury, Phil Coulson and S.H.I.E.L.D. in the game's main story. The Avengers lineup in the game was closely based on the Marvel Cinematic Universe version of the team with its members being Captain America, Iron Man, Hulk, Thor, Black Widow, and Hawkeye, other Avengers members included Ant-Man, the Black Panther, the Falcon, Ms. Marvel, Moon Knight, the She-Hulk, War Machine, the Winter Soldier, and the Wasp.  A spin-off game titled Lego Marvel's Avengers was released in 2015 and stars the Avengers with levels based on various MCU films.

A first person Avengers action game was planned by THQ Studio Australia to coincide with the release of the first live-action movie in 2012. The game would have featured Iron Man, Captain America, the Hulk, and Thor as the main characters, with Black Widow, Hawkeye, War Machine, and Ms. Marvel appearing as unlockable characters. The story, loosely based on Secret Invasion rather than the movie, was penned by veteran comic writer Brian Michael Bendis. Though a fair amount of progress was made on the game, it was ultimately canceled after THQ Studio Australia was closed down. In late January 2017, Marvel announced a joint partnership with Square Enix for a multi-game project, starting with a game based on the Avengers, with more information to be revealed in 2018.

The Avengers, while not making an appearance are referenced in Marvel's Spider-Man, particularly Captain America and Iron Man in Otto Octavius' bio. In addition their headquarters Avengers Tower appears as a landmark.

On January 26, 2017, Marvel announced that Square Enix and Crystal Dynamics will be working on an untitled Avengers project. On June 1, 2019, through Avengers' Instagram, Facebook and Twitter accounts, Marvel announced that the game would be titled Marvel's Avengers and the game will have a worldwide reveal at Square Enix's panel at E3 2019. The game will feature single player, and online multiplayer, with an evergrowing roster. All extra regions and characters will be free downloadable content.

Iron Man, Doctor Strange, Captain Marvel, Hulk and Captain America of the Avengers appear in Marvel's Midnight Suns as part of the titular team. Black Widow and Thor are mentioned. During the course of the game, it's mentioned that the rest of the Avengers are spread thin across the world, dealing with the Hydra forces acting as distractions.

Theme parks
Walt Disney Imagineering, in collaboration with Marvel Studios and Marvel Themed Entertainment, developed Marvel-themed lands at Disney California Adventure, Walt Disney Studios Park, and Hong Kong Disneyland, called Avengers Campus, the first of which opened in 2021 at Disney California Adventure. Rides based on the Avengers are expected to play a role in all three parks.

Live performance
The Avengers appear as the main characters in the live-action stage show Marvel Universe: LIVE!. The line-up in the show features Iron Man, Captain America, the Hulk, Thor, Hawkeye, the Black Widow, the Falcon, and Captain Marvel, with Wolverine and Spider-Man assisting them in the crisis.

See also
 Captain America in other media
 Hulk in other media
 Iron Man in other media
 Thor (Marvel Comics) in other media

References

External links